Robin Elliot may refer to:

Robin Elliot, character in Sons and Daughters (Australian TV series)
Robin Elliot, on Young Star Search

See also
Robin Elliott, pen name of Joan Elliott Pickart